Renard Aerodrome  is located near Renard diamond mine, Quebec, Canada.

References

Registered aerodromes in Quebec